The National Information Technology Development Agency (NITDA) is a public service institution established by NITDA Act 2007 as the ICT policy implementing arm of the Federal Ministry of Communication and Digital Economy of the Federal Republic of Nigeria. It has sole responsibility of developing programs that caters for the running of ICT related activities in the country. NITDA is also mandated with the implementation of policies guideline for driving ICT in Nigeria.  
It plays advisory role in copyright law by verification and revision of applicable laws in tandem with the application of software and technology acquisition. Majority of these activities are achieved through organization of workshops which cater for training needs of her staff, government functionaries and education sectors.

History
As part of the history of Nigeria, ICT related activities started in 1950. NITDA was commissioned by the administration of President Olusegun Obasanjo through the perfection of a bill designed to provide for the establishment of National Information Technology Development in 2007 (NITDA Act). Operations of NITDA started in 2001, six years before the bill was passed into law. The agency's main objective is to provide ICT as a tool in tertiary institution to drive the mechanism of education sector in the country. Its creation has given birth to the establishment of state ICT agencies in other states of Federation such as the Plateau State Information And Communication Technology Development Agency. 
The agency started her operation in Abuja, FCT with 30 computers. These devices were used for the training of major government functionaries which include the president and his ministers. Within the first three years of establishment, the agency supplied 5700 computers system to over 187 educational institutions in the country which includes: universities, secondary and primary schools.

The National Information Technology Development Agency (NIRDA) is known for introduction of professional training programme across various states in Nigeria. In the year 2020 NITDA announced it would train 75,000 youths in Kaduna state in information technology, fast forward 2022, they organize a programme called the "Digital Economy Employability Programme" which is aimed at training over 200,000 thousand Nigerians from all over the country alongside the Web/App Development training partnering with Steamledge Limited which is to train 50 Abuja residents in the field of IT and software development.

References

Government agencies of Nigeria